Redlichiidae is a family of redlichiid trilobites which lived from the Botomian to the Middle Cambrian period. It contains the following genera, divided between five subfamilies:

Redlichiinae

 Redlichia (type genus)
 Conoredlichia
 Latiredlichia
 Pteroredlichia
 Syndianella

Metaredlichiinae

 Metaredlichia (type genus)
 Bornemannaspis
 Breviredlichia
 Iglesiella
 Jingyangia
 Maopingaspis
 Nebidella
 Parazhenbaspis
 Pseudoredlichia
 Sardoredlichia
 Ushbaspis
 Xela
 Zhenbaspis

Neoredlichiinae

 Neoredlichia (type genus)
 Leptoredlichia
 Olgaspis
 Xenoredlichia

Pararedlichiinae

 Eoredlichia (type genus)
 Irgitkhemia
 Lemdadella
 Ningqiangaspis
 Pachyredlichia
 Redlichops

Wutingaspinae

 Wutingaspis (type genus)
 Chaoaspis
 Chengjiangaspis
 Kepingaspis
 Kuanyangia
 Sapushania
 Sardaspis
 Wenganaspis
 Yorkella

References 

 
Trilobite families
Cambrian trilobites
Cambrian first appearances
Cambrian extinctions